"Hold On" is a song by British musician Sbtrkt; the stage name of Aaron Jerome. It features on vocals Sbtrkt's main collaborator and live bandmate, Sampha. The single was released on 21 February 2012.

A cover has been recorded by Solveig Heilo from the Norwegian band Katzenjammer.

Reception
The track has been met with positive reviews by music critics such as Pitchfork and AllMusic, noting that it works well with the rest of the album, and many reviewers noting it as a "highlight" of the album.

Music video
The music video for "Hold On" was released on 29 March 2012. It was directed by Sam Pilling and produced by Jo-Jo Ellison.

Track listing

References

2012 singles
SBTRKT songs
2011 songs
Songs written by Sampha
Young Turks (record label) singles